Jilugumilli or Jeelugu-milli is a village in West Godavari district of the Indian state of Andhra Pradesh.

Geography
It has an average elevation of 166 metres (547 ft).

Demographics 

 Census of India, Jeelugumilli had a population of 4043. The total population constitute, 1920 males and 2123 females with a sex ratio of 1106 females per 1000 males. 473 children are in the age group of 0–6 years, with sex ratio of 1075. The average literacy rate stands at 75.15%.

References 

Villages in West Godavari district